The Bedfordshire Police and Crime Commissioner is the police and crime commissioner, an elected official tasked with setting out the way crime is tackled by Bedfordshire Police in the English County of Bedfordshire. The post was created in November 2012, following an election held on 15 November 2012, and replaced the Bedfordshire Police Authority. The current incumbent is Festus Akinbusoye, who represents the Conservative Party.
The current chief executive of the OPCC is Clare Kelly.

List of Bedfordshire Police and Crime Commissioners

See also 

 England and Wales police and crime commissioner elections, 2016

References

Police and crime commissioners in England